Mask Singer: Adivina quién canta ("Mask Singer: Guess who sings") is a Spanish reality singing competition series produced by Fremantle for Antena 3. It is the Spanish adaptation of the Masked Singer franchise.

Format
The show follows a similar format to that of the British version. A total of 12 celebrities compete, split into two groups of 6 for the first episodes, with everyone competing at once starting from the fifth episode. The contestants are paired up in one-on-one duels, with the loser of each duel being up for elimination. The least voted contestant is unmasked and eliminated from the competition.

Some episodes include guest masked performers who reveal themselves after their performance.

Panelists and host
Arturo Valls serves as the show's host, and is joined by a permanent panel of 'investigators' composed of actors Javier Calvo and Javier Ambrossi and comedian José Mota. Some episodes also feature guest panelists. Opera singer Ainhoa Arteta was initially slated to be in the panel, but pulled out due to delays in production caused by the coronavirus pandemic and was replaced by Malú. Also, Vanesa Martín stood in for Malú when she missed a taping due to injury and Eva González appeared as a guest investigator.

Season one winner, Paz Vega, replaced singer Malú as investigator in season two, after she opted out in order to coach on La Voz. On 13 January 2022, it was confirmed Ambrossi and Calvo would return for their third series as investigators, joined by Mónica Naranjo and Ana Obregón.

Series overview

References

2020s Spanish television series
2020 Spanish television series debuts
Antena 3 (Spanish TV channel) network series
Spanish game shows
Spanish music television series
Spanish reality television series
Spanish television series based on South Korean television series
Television series by Fremantle (company)
Masked Singer